Jiaokou County is a county in Lüliang City, Shanxi province, China.

Administrative divisions
Jiaokou county includes the towns:
 Chengguan (城关镇)
 Shuangchi (双池镇)
 Taohongpo (桃红坡镇)
 Kancheng (康城镇)

and the townships:
 Shikou (石口乡)
 Huilong (回龙乡)
 Wenquan (温泉乡)

History
Jiaokou county was developed in 1971. The local government is in Shuitou.

Climate

Other information
Sea buckthorn is a famous wild plant which grows locally. Its juice has a special flavor, so some local factories produce and sell it; one of these companies is Weishijie.

References

External links
 Jiaokou County Government's official website
 www.xzqh.org 

County-level divisions of Shanxi